There have been three baronetcies created for persons with the surname Primrose, two in the Baronetage of Nova Scotia and one in the Baronetage of the United Kingdom.

The Primrose Baronetcy, of Carrington in the County of Selkirk, was created in the Baronetage of Nova Scotia on 1 August 1651. For more information on this creation see the Viscount of Primrose and the Earl of Rosebery.

The Foulis, later Primrose Baronetcy, of Ravelstoun, was created in the Baronetage of Nova Scotia on 15 September 1661. For more information, see Foulis baronets.

The Primrose Baronetcy, of Redholme, Dumbreck, in Govan in the County of the City of Glasgow, was created in the Baronetage of the United Kingdom on 7 July 1903 for John Primrose. He was a senior partner in the firm of William Primrose and Sons, flour millers, of Glasgow, and served as Lord Provost of Glasgow from 1903 to 1905.

Primrose baronets, of Carrington (1651)
see the Viscount of Primrose and the Earl of Rosebery

Foulis, later Primrose baronets, of Ravelstoun (1661)
see Foulis baronets

Primrose baronets, of Redholme (1903)
Sir John Ure Primrose, 1st Baronet (1847–1924)
Sir William Louis Primrose, 2nd Baronet (1880–1953)
Sir John Ure Primrose, 3rd Baronet (1908–1984)
Sir Alasdair Neil Primrose, 4th Baronet (1935–1986)
Sir John Ure Primrose, 5th Baronet (born 1960)

Notes

References
Kidd, Charles, Williamson, David (editors). Debrett's Peerage and Baronetage (1990 edition). New York: St Martin's Press, 1990, 

Baronetcies in the Baronetage of Nova Scotia
Baronetcies in the Baronetage of the United Kingdom
Forfeited baronetcies
1651 establishments in Nova Scotia
1903 establishments in the United Kingdom